Kalan (also Romanized as Kalān) is a village in Lavasan-e Bozorg Rural District, Lavasanat District, Shemiranat County, Tehran Province, Iran. At the 2006 census, its population was 546, in 142 families.

References 

Populated places in Shemiranat County